Edwin Brown (died 1999) was a British actor.

In the 1970s, he was a member of the National Theatre company, appearing in Robert Bolt's State of Revolution and Shane Connaughton's Sir is Winning.

He had a lengthy career in television, often playing policemen or similar roles. His film roles included a prison warder in the comedy Two-Way Stretch (1960), and Albert Pierrepoint, the hangman, in 10 Rillington Place (1971).

Filmography

References

External links 

English male stage actors
English male television actors
Year of birth unknown
Place of birth missing
1999 deaths